Below are the team rosters for the baseball competition at the 2020 Summer Olympics.

Rosters

Dominican Republic
The Dominican Baseball Federation announced their final roster on July 8, 2021. Gabriel Arias replaced Diego Goris on the Olympic team roster after Goris tested positive for cannabis. Ramón Rosso replaced Gerson Bautista on the roster when Bautista had to enter COVID-19 health and safety protocols.

Israel
The Israel Association of Baseball announced the team's final roster on July 5, 2021. The team is composed mostly of American Jews with only four Israeli-born players.

Japan

The final roster was announced on 16 June 2021.

Mexico

On July 8, 2021, Mexico's final roster was announced. Héctor Velázquez and Sammy Solís were removed from the roster after testing positive for COVID-19. They were replaced by Édgar Arredondo and Fabián Anguamea. Ryan Goins replaced Brandon Laird, who did not receive permission from his professional team to participate.

South Korea
The Korea Baseball Organization announced the team's final roster on June 15, 2021.

United States
USA Baseball announced the final roster on July 2, 2021.

References

Baseball
Team squads
2020